Poecilopsyra is a monotypic genus of katydids or bush crickets native to Malesia. The single (type) species, Poecilopsyra octoseriata, was originally taken from Borneo.

References

Phaneropterinae
Orthoptera of Asia
Monotypic Orthoptera genera